Jarle Bernhoft (Jarle Norman Bernhoft-Sjødin; born 21 June 1976), known professionally as Bernhoft (often stylized as Bern/hoft), is a Norwegian singer, multi-instrumentalist, composer and lyricist. Bernhoft is from Nittedal in Norway. His best known songs are "Streetlights", "Shout" (a Tears for Fears cover), "Choices", "C'mon Talk" and "Stay With Me". He has also been in a number of bands, notably Explicit Lyrics and Span.

In June 2014 he appeared for the first time at the Glastonbury Festival and was featured by BBC One in a special performance of his song "Wind You Up."

In December 2014, it was announced that his album Islander was nominated for a Grammy Award for Best R&B Album for the 2015 Grammy Awards ceremony, held on 8 February 2015.

With bands

in Explicit Lyrics
Hailing from Nittedal, Bernhoft attended Rud Upper Secondary School in Bærum where he joined the musical scene. Bernhoft, alongside Fridtjof "Joff" Nilsen, were members of Explicit Lyrics. Within a span of three years, the band released three albums, Fleshpulse (1996), Flow (1997) and Lipshave (1998).

Span

After the breakup of Explicit Lyrics, Bernhoft, a vocalist and songwriter, and guitarist Nilsen joined drummer Fredrik Wallumrød and bassist Vemund Stavnes to form the band Span. After two EPs, Baby's Come Back (2002) and Found (2003), SPAN had two successful albums, Mass Distraction (2004) and Vs. Time (2005). The band broke up in 2005.

Other collaborations
Bernhoft has contributed on a number of recordings and concerts with mostly Norwegian artists, such as Hanne Hukkelberg, Dadafon, Bigbang and The Køhn/Johansen Sextet.

He also played in the band Green Granadas using the stage name Rod Hot.

Solo

He released his first solo album Ceramik City Chronicles on 1 September 2008. In January 2010 Bernhoft released a double live album called 1:Man 2:Band, where one half is a recording from his solo show at a jazz café in Oslo (Kampen Bistro), and the other half is a recording from his concerts in Rockefeller and Molde Jazz Festival with a full band.

His second solo album, Solidarity Breaks, was released the next year in January 2011. It topped the VG-lista,. the Norwegian Albums Chart for a total of seven weeks (in July, August and September 2011). The album was credited to Bern/hoft rather than his full name Jarle Bernhoft. He was also credited as Bern/hoft in his 2014 follow-up album Islanders that also topped the VG-lista chart in May 2014.

In popular culture
In September 2011, Bernhoft appeared on The Ellen DeGeneres Show after producers of the show found his video on YouTube. While on the show he played his song "C'mon Talk".

In July 2013, and again in June 2014, he was featured as a musical guest on "Conan" on TBS.

Discography

Albums
With Explicit Lyrics
1996: Fleshpulse(EP) 
1998: Lipshave

With Span
2004: Mass Distraction
2005: Vs. Time

With Børre Dalhaug's Bigbandblast
2004: Bigbandblast! (Real Records)

Solo (studio)

Solo (Live)

Singles
With Span
2002: "Baby's Come Back" 
2002: "On My Way Down"
2003: "Found" 
2004: "Don't Think the Way They Do"
2005: "Cut Like Diamonds"
Solo
2008: "Streetlights"
2008: "Sunday"
2009: "Fly Away"
2011: "C'mon Talk"
2011: "Choices"
2012: "Stay with Me"
2012: "Shout" (France: #187)
2014: "Come Around" (France: #181)
2015: "Everyone's A Stranger"
2016: "We Have a Dream"
2021: "Say It Isn't So"
2021: "C'mon Talk V2"
2021: "Call out Kids"
2021: "Clearly Confused"
2021: "All My Loving"

References

External links

 Official website
  Bernhoft biography in The Guardian
 Interview with Uberrock  - October 2010
 Bernhoft on Ronnie Scott's radio

1976 births
20th-century Norwegian male singers
20th-century Norwegian singers
21st-century Norwegian male singers
21st-century Norwegian singers
Norwegian musicians
Scandinavian musicians
Norwegian rock singers
Norwegian jazz singers
Norwegian songwriters
Norwegian jazz guitarists
Norwegian rock guitarists
Norwegian male guitarists
Norwegian male bass guitarists
Living people
People from Nittedal
Neo soul singers
English-language singers from Norway
Norwegian expatriates in the United States
20th-century Norwegian bass guitarists
21st-century Norwegian guitarists
21st-century Norwegian bass guitarists
Male jazz musicians